Melaleuca foliolosa is a plant in the myrtle family, Myrtaceae and is endemic to northern Queensland in  Australia. It is distinguished by it very small leaves which are pressed against the stem and almost overlap each other.

Description
They are almost triangular in shape and pressed against the stem so that they almost overlap.

The flowers are cream to greenish white and arranged in short spikes or almost spherical heads in the upper leaf axils. The stamens are arranged in five bundles around the flower, each bundle containing 20 to 35 stamens.

Taxonomy and naming
Melaleuca foliolosa was first formally described in 1866 by George Bentham in Flora Australiensis from a specimen collected by Allan Cunningham at Cape Flinders. The specific epithet (foliolosa) is from the Latin word folium meaning "leaf", hence foliolose, referring to the numerous, small leaves of this species.

Distribution and habitat
This melaleuca is found throughout the Cape York Peninsula growing in woodland and savannah in sand, clay and near coastal salt pans. It forms a low shrubland on the margins of saline flats near the Annan River.

Ecology
Melaleuca foliolosa is host to the mistletoe species Amyema herbertiana and Notothixos incanus. It is also an important component of the environment of the endangered Golden-shouldered parrot (Psephotus chrysopterygius).

References

foliolosa
Myrtales of Australia
Flora of Queensland
Plants described in 1866